Latouchia is a genus of Asian mygalomorph spiders in the family Halonoproctidae, first described by Reginald Innes Pocock in 1901. Originally placed with the Ctenizidae, it was moved to the Halonoproctidae in 2018.

Species
 it contains 26 species from India to Southeast Asia:
Latouchia bachmaensis Ono, 2010 – Vietnam
Latouchia cornuta Song, Qiu & Zheng, 1983 – China
Latouchia cryptica (Simon, 1897) – India
Latouchia cunicularia (Simon, 1886) – Vietnam
Latouchia davidi (Simon, 1886) (type) – China
Latouchia formosensis Kayashima, 1943 – Taiwan
Latouchia f. smithi Tso, Haupt & Zhu, 2003 – Taiwan
Latouchia fossoria Pocock, 1901 – China
Latouchia huberi Decae, 2019 – Vietnam
Latouchia hunanensis Xu, Yin & Bao, 2002 – China
Latouchia hyla Haupt & Shimojana, 2001 – Japan (Ryukyu Is.)
Latouchia incerta Decae, Schwendinger & Hongpadharakiree, 2021 – Thailand
Latouchia japonica Strand, 1910 – Japan
Latouchia kitabensis (Charitonov, 1946) – Central Asia
Latouchia maculosa Decae, Schwendinger & Hongpadharakiree, 2021 – Thailand
Latouchia parameleomene Haupt & Shimojana, 2001 – Japan (Okinawa)
Latouchia pavlovi Schenkel, 1953 – China
Latouchia rufa Zhang & Wang, 2021 – China
Latouchia schwendingeri Decae, 2019 – Vietnam
Latouchia stridulans Decae, 2019 – Vietnam
Latouchia swinhoei Pocock, 1901 – Japan (Ryukyu Is.)
Latouchia typica (Kishida, 1913) – China, Japan
Latouchia vinhiensis Schenkel, 1963 – China
Latouchia wenruni (Lin & Li, 2023) – China (Hainan)
Latouchia yejiei Zhang & Wang, 2021 – China (Hainan)
Latouchia yuanjingae (Lin & Li, 2022) – China (Hainan)

References

Halonoproctidae
Mygalomorphae genera
Taxa named by R. I. Pocock